Edwin de Leon Olivarez (born August 14, 1963) is a Filipino politician, athlete, and businessman currently serving as a Member of the Philippine House of Representatives from Parañaque's 1st District since 2022 and previously from 2010 to 2013. He previously served as Mayor of Parañaque from 2013 to 2022, as well as the Metro Manila Council Chair and head of the Regional Peace and Order Council – National Capital Region in concurrent capacity. He also served as board member of Laguna before serving as Vice Governor of Laguna under Teresita Lazaro from 2004 to 2007. He unsuccessfully ran for Governor of Laguna in 2007.

Olivarez played on the national tennis team, and was NCAA Junior and Senior Tennis Champion.

Olivarez is the son of former mayor and incumbent San Dionisio barangay captain Pablo Olivarez and older brother of incumbent mayor Eric Olivarez. He is married to Janet Angeles and they have three children. His eldest son, Pablo II, is an incumbent councilor of Parañaque from the 1st district since 2022.

References

1963 births
Living people
21st-century Filipino politicians
Filipino male tennis players
Members of the House of Representatives of the Philippines from Parañaque
Members of the Laguna Provincial Board
Mayors of Parañaque
PDP–Laban politicians
Liberal Party (Philippines) politicians
United Opposition (Philippines) politicians
De La Salle University alumni